Martin Aunin (born 17 May 1971) is an Estonian architect.

Aunin was born in Tartu. From 1989 he studied in the Tallinn University of Arts (today's Estonian Academy of Arts) in the department of architecture. He graduated from the university in 1993. From 1993 to 1994 he studied in the Technical University of Helsinki. In 1997 he received his MA in architecture from the Estonian Academy of Arts and from the Technical University of Helsinki.

From 1991 to present Aunin has worked in various architectural bureaus - Architectural Burea Masso&Luup, Rein Murula Architectural Bureau, Kalle Rõõmus Architectural Bureau, Masso Architectural Bureau. From 1997 Martin Aunin has mainly worked for EA-Reng architectural, planning and building bureau. Most notable works by Martin Aunin include Lemon department store, Viimsi St. James' Church in Viimsi, single-family home in Tabasalu, Hotel Ülemiste and Hotel Telegraaf in the old town of Tallinn. Martin Aunin has also been successful in many national and international architectural competitions and has received many architectural awards.

Works
apartment building in Tallinn, 1994
apartment building in Kaupmehe street, 1995
hotel Domina City in Tallinn, 2001
Lemon department store, 2001
Villa Orro in Tabasalu, 2003
Hotel Ülemiste in Tallinn, 2004
Tetris office building in Tallinn, 2004
single-family home in Matka street, 2004
hotel Telegraaf in Tallinn, 2007
St. James's Church in Viimsi, 2007

Competitions
pedestrian bridge in Paide, 2003; 1. prize
planning competition for the Aegna island, 2004; 2. prize
housing competition for Logi street 8 and 10, 2005 (with Martin Melioranski); 1. prize
housing competition for the old Tondi military base,  2005 (with Martin Melioranski); 1. prize
Joint building for ministries, 2007 (with Martin Melioranski); 1. prize
Art Hotel Tallinn, 2008 (with Martin Melioranski); 1. prize

Awards
Architectural prize of the Estonian Cultural Endowment, 2004
Concrete Building 2004
Concrete Building 2005
Concrete building 2007

References
 Union of Estonian Architects, chartered architects, Martin Aunin
 Young Architect Award 2008, nominees, Martin Aunin CV
 Ingrid Lillemägi: House on Matka St, Tallinn, MAJA 1-2004
 Urmas Oja: Ülemiste Hotel, 2 Lennujaama Rd, Tallinn Ülemiste Hotel, 2 Lennujaama Rd, Tallinn, MAJA 3-2004

1971 births
Living people
Estonian architects
Estonian Academy of Arts alumni
People from Tartu